Bandbon or Band Bon or Band-e Bon, also rendered as Bandbun, may refer to various places in Iran:

Castle 

 Bandbon castle

Gilan Province
 Band-e Bon, Gilan
 Bandbon-e Bala, Gilan Province
 Bandbon-e Beneksar, Gilan Province
 Bandbon-e Pain, Gilan Province
 Bandbon-e Qasemabad, Gilan Province
 Bandbon-e Ujargah, Gilan Province

Mazandaran Province
 Bandbon, Babol, Mazandaran Province
 Bandbon-e Kabud Tabar, Babol County, Mazandaran Province
 Band-e Bon, Neka, Mazandaran Province
 Band-e Bon, Sari, Mazandaran Province
 Band Bon, Tonekabon, Mazandaran Province